Christian Saydee (born 10 May 2002) is an English footballer who plays as a forward for Shrewsbury Town, on loan from Bournemouth.

Career

Early career
A youth product of Pro Touch SA  and Reading, Saydee moved to Bournemouth's academy at the age of 16.

AFC Bournemouth
Saydee started his career with English Premier League side Bournemouth. In 2020, he was sent on loan to Poole Town in the English seventh division. After that, Saydee was sent on loan to English fifth division club Weymouth. On 31 July 2021, he debuted for Bournemouth during a 5–0 win over MK Dons, scoring a goal and getting an assist on his debut for the club. Saydee made his league debut for the Cherries in the opening fixture of the season; a 2–2 home draw against West Brom.

Loan to Burton Albion
On 31 January 2022, Saydee joined EFL League One side Burton Albion on loan for the remainder of the 2021–22 season.

Loan to Shrewsbury Town
On 1 September 2022, Saydee joined EFL League One side Shrewsbury Town on loan for the 2022–23 season. Saydee scored his first goal for the club, and his first in the EFL, in a 2–1 loss to Port Vale on the 17th September. Saydee's good form in the tail-end of 2022 earned him Shrewsbury Town's player of the month award for December, scoring two goals across a victory against Bolton Wanderers and a loss to Cambridge United.  He then scored a career-first brace in senior football, netting two goals in a 4-0 victory against former club Burton Albion on the 14th January.

Personal life
Born in England, Saydee is of Liberian descent.

Career statistics

References

External links
 
 

2002 births
Living people
Footballers from Hillingdon
English footballers
English people of Liberian descent
Association football forwards
Weymouth F.C. players
Poole Town F.C. players
Burton Albion F.C. players
AFC Bournemouth players
National League (English football) players
English Football League players
Southern Football League players
Black British sportspeople